The 2017–18 NACAM Formula 4 Championship season was the third season of the NACAM Formula 4 Championship. It began on 2 September 2017 at the Autódromo Hermanos Rodríguez in Mexico City and ended on 30 June 2018 at the same venue after eight rounds.

Teams and drivers

Race calendar and results

A provisional calendar was made public on the days leading to the first round on 3 September 2017. As opposed to the previous year, all rounds were held in Mexico. The first two rounds were held in support of the 2017 6 Hours of Mexico and the 2017 Mexican Grand Prix, respectively.
An updated version of the calendar was released in November 2017, which was in turn amended in February 2018.

Championship standings

Points were awarded to the top 10 classified finishers in each race.

Drivers' Championship

See also
 Panam GP Series
 LATAM Challenge Series

References

External links 

  

NACAM Formula 4 Championship seasons
NACAM
NACAM
NACAM
NACAM
NACAM F4
NACAM F4